There are two species of lizard named northern teiid:
 Alopoglossus angulatus, species endemic to northern South America
 Alopoglossus carinicaudatus, a species found in Ecuador and Peru